Fossilfjellet is a mountain in Nordenskiöld Land at Spitsbergen, Svalbard. It has a height of 828 m.a.s.l. and is located between Grøndalen and Hollendardalen, within the range of Kolspissfjella. The upper part of the mountain consists of Tertiary sandstones with plant fossils.

References

Mountains of Spitsbergen